The Saanich Formation is a geologic formation in the Puget Sound area of Washington. It consists of Pleistocene marine siloclastic deposits preserving fossils.

See also
 List of fossiliferous stratigraphic units in Washington (state)
 Paleontology in Washington (state)

References

Geologic formations of Washington (state)